Josephites were a movement in Russian Orthodox Church, originated in the USSR at the end of 1927. The name is derived from the name of Metropolitan Joseph (Petrovykh) of Petrograd. The Josephites were the most numerous and united church movement among the non-commemorates. According to historians Mikhail Shkarovsky and Alexey Beglov, the number of parishes that joined Josephism reached about 2.5 thousand. Leningrad became the center of the movement, and Josephism was also widely spread in the Vyatka, Izhevsk, Novgorod, Voronezh, Tambov, Krasnodar, Kiev and Kharkov dioceses.

The resistance began after Metropolitan Sergius (Stragorodsky) issued  to all members of the Russian Orthodox Church, in which Sergius called for loyalty toward the Soviet government: "We need to show, not in words but in deeds, that not only those who are indifferent to Orthodox Christianity, not only those who have betrayed it, but also its most zealous adherents, for whom it is dear as truth and life, with all its dogmas and traditions, with all its canonical and liturgical structure, can be faithful citizens of the Soviet Union, loyal to the Soviet government. We want to be Orthodox and at the same time recognize the Soviet Union as our civil motherland, whose joys and successes are our joys and successes and whose failures are our failures."

References

Further reading

 Mikhail Shkarovsky.  Josif (Petrovych), in irriducibile della fede // La nuova Europa (Bergamo, Italia). 2002. N 1. P. 83–94.
 Михаил Шкаровский Судьбы иосифлянских пастырей: Иосифлянское движение Русской Православной Церкви в судьбах его участников. СПб., 2006.

Catacomb Church
Eastern Orthodox organizations established in the 20th century
20th-century Eastern Orthodoxy